Ziyu "Sally" Zhang (born 10 December 1990) is an Australian table tennis player. She competed at the 2016 Summer Olympics as part of the Australian team in the women's team event.

References

1990 births
Living people
Olympic table tennis players of Australia
Table tennis players at the 2016 Summer Olympics
Commonwealth Games medallists in table tennis
Commonwealth Games bronze medallists for Australia
Naturalised table tennis players
Table tennis players from Shijiazhuang
Table tennis players at the 2014 Commonwealth Games
Medallists at the 2014 Commonwealth Games